The Muhafiz Khan Mosque is a fifteenth-century mosque located in the city of Ahmedabad in the Indian state of Gujarat. It is considered to be one of the more exceptional structures in the city. The mosque was constructed in 1465 by Jamail-ud-Din Muhafiz Khan during the reign of Mahmud Shah I (1458-1511), and is considered to be an excellent example of Mughal architecture. It is named for the governor of the region at that time. The mosque is a protected building under the auspices of the Archaeological Survey of India.

The façade of the mosque has three arched entrances and a richly carved  minaret at either end. The design has similarities with the Isanpur mosque and introduced a new architectural style to Ahmedabad. Alexander Forbes had replicas of the mosque made from wood and returned to England c 1880-1885, they now reside at the Victoria and Albert Museum in London.

During the communal violence in 2002, the mosque was extensively damaged. Afzal Khan said that rioters damaged intricate carvings on the southern elevations of the building and that the damage to be irreparable. This damage has caused upset among India's Muslim population. The restoration of shrines and mosques was debated extensively in parliament The Indian History Congress(IHC) has requested that the Archaeological Survey of India restore and rebuild all religious structures. Ramakrishna Chatterjee, stated to the IHC that the mosques of Muhafiz Khan, the tomb of Wali Mohammed Wali and the mosque of Malik Asin had been damaged or destroyed. By 2006 restoration work had been completed and the mosque reopened to the public.

Gallery

References

Mosque architecture
Mosques in Ahmedabad
Religious buildings and structures completed in 1685
Monuments of National Importance in Gujarat